The Cavan Under-21 Football Championship is an annual Gaelic Athletic Association club competition between Cavan Under-21 Gaelic football clubs. It was first competed for in 1975. Ramor United have won the most titles, having been victorious 5 times. 3 of these titles came when they amalgamated with Munterconnaught. The 2012 Under-21 football champions were Cavan Gaels.

Division 1

Preliminary round

Quarter-finals

Semi-final

Final

Division 2

Preliminary round

Quarter-finals

Semi-final

Final

References

External links
 Cavan at ClubGAA
 Official Cavan GAA Website

Cavan u21 Football Championship
Cavan GAA Football championships